The President Show is an American comedy television series that premiered on April 27, 2017, on Comedy Central. The show was created by Anthony Atamanuik who also stars as Donald Trump, the former President of the United States, alongside Peter Grosz as Mike Pence, the Vice President.

Format
Introduced as "the forty-fifth and final President of the United States", Atamanuik as Trump begins each episode at a "press-conference" set, during which he announces tonight's theme and a variation of his catchphrase, "I'm the president. Can you believe it? Let's roll!", which signals a transition to the title sequence. After the opening, Trump is shown in the Oval Office set, accompanied by Peter Grosz as Mike Pence, and the two perform a segment pertaining to the recent week's news. Next, a pre-taped segment is shown with either Trump, Pence, or both on-location interacting with various groups of people in-character. After that, Trump interviews a guest at a Mar-a-Lago set. Finally, back in the Oval Office, Trump and Pence deliver a farewell address, often taking form of a sketch, which transitions into the closing credits.

Cast and characters

Main
 Anthony Atamanuik as Donald Trump
 Peter Grosz as Mike Pence

Recurring
 John Gemberling as Steve Bannon
 Mila Filatova	as Melania Trump
 Mario Cantone as Anthony Scaramucci
 James Adomian as Bernie Sanders
 Adam Pally as Donald Trump Jr.

Guest
 Neil Casey as Andrew Jackson
 Ric Stoneback as Roger Ailes
 Lewis Black as Trump's subconscious
 Kathy Najimy as Ivana Trump
 Kathy Griffin as Kellyanne Conway
 Griffin Dunne as Robert Mueller
 Stephanie March as Ivanka Trump

Episodes

Season 1 (2017)
{{Episode table
|background=#040531
|overall= 
|aux1=
|aux1T=Guest
|aux3=
|aux3T=Theme
|airdate=
|country=US
|viewers=
|episodes=

{{Episode list
 |EpisodeNumber= 18
 |RTitle=Ana Kasparian
 |OriginalAirDate= 
 |Viewers= 0.275
 |ShortSummary= The president goes to see a psychologist and sits down with The Young Turks''' Ana Kasparian.
 | Aux3 = Friends
 |LineColor= 040531
}}

}}

Specials

Production
Background

Atamanuik began impersonating Trump during the 2016 United States presidential campaign. His first efforts were improvisations with the Upright Citizens Brigade in August 2015. In a subsequent sketch series called Trump vs. Bernie, Atamanuik challenged James Adomian, who played Bernie Sanders, in mock debates. The two toured the United States and appeared on television. They went on Comedy Central's @midnight in March 2016, and had a one-hour sketch special on Fusion in May 2016. Atamanuik also appeared by himself as Trump on several shows during the campaign, including @midnight, The Chris Gethard Show and The View.

Atamanuik would later originate his idea for the series by envisioning his idea of President Donald Trump's version of a fireside chat – "this sort of late night show in the vein of Steve Allen and Johnny Carson... but set in the Oval Office".

Development
On March 30, 2017, Comedy Central announced a new late night program via two Twitter accounts: @PresidentShow and @LateNightDonald. The network did not provide further details at the time of this announcement. A few days later, the series was officially announced. It was reported that the series was created by Anthony Atamanuik and executive produced by Adam Pally. The show was set to feature Atamanuik hosting as president Donald Trump and Peter Grosz acting as his sidekick in the form of vice president Mike Pence. Production companies involved with the series were set to include Clone Wolf Productions and 3 Arts Entertainment.

The show's production staff was eventually filled out with Andre Allen acting as director and Atamanuik, Grosz, Pally, Jason Ross, Olivia Gerke, Josh Lieberman, and Greg Walter set as executive producers. The show is presented in the typical format of a late-night talk show, including desk segments, field pieces, and guest interviews. The show's writers are Atamaniuk, Grosz, Ross, John Gemberling, Mitra Jouhari, Christine Nangle, Rae Sanni, Evan Waite, Neil Casey, and Emmy Blotnick.

Casting
On March 29, 2018, it was announced that Kathy Griffin had been cast as Kellyanne Conway in the "Make America Great-A-Thon" special. The following day, it was announced that Griffin Dunne had also been cast in the special as Robert Mueller. On September 27, 2018, it was announced that Stephanie March had been cast as Ivanka Trump in the "A President Show Documentary: The Fall Of Donald Trump" special and that Grosz, Griffin, Cantone, Pally, and Gemberling would reprise their respective characters.

Release
Marketing
Simultaneously alongside the show's official announcement, Comedy Central released the first teaser trailer for the series.

Comedy Central conducted a viral marketing campaign to advertise the show by inserting footage in episodes of The Daily Show and @midnight to make it appear the network had been hacked; footage shown included a web address with a Russian country code, which redirected to The President Shows Twitter account.

Renewal
On May 23, 2017, Comedy Central extended the first season by ordering an additional seven episodes. On January 15, 2018, Comedy Central president Kent Alterman discussed the show at the annual Television Critics Association's winter press tour. In regards to the show's future he said, "We're working that out" and that "we'll have something soon." On March 14, 2018, it was announced that the series would officially return for two one-hour specials. The first special was announced as being titled Make America Great-A-Thon: A President Show Special and that it would air on April 3, 2018. On September 27, 2018, it was announced that the second special had been titled A President Show Documentary: The Fall Of Donald Trump and that it would air on October 22, 2018.

Reception
Critical responseThe President Show has been met with a mixed response from critics since its premiere. On the review aggregation website Rotten Tomatoes, the series holds a 67% approval rating with an average rating of 6.67 out of 10 based on 12 reviews. Metacritic, which uses a weighted average, assigned the series a score of 58 out of 100 based on 5 reviews, indicating "mixed or average reviews".

Writing in The Daily Beast'', Matt Wilstein called Atamanuik's work "the most scathing and hilarious impression of the 45th president in a very crowded field... On Comedy Central’s The President Show and a series of increasingly apocalyptic specials, Atamanuik did far more than just jokingly mimic Trump. Rather, he tried to take viewers inside the demented mind of the most dangerous president in modern American history."

Ratings
The series premiere had one million viewers over the course of three days and the show averages about 870,000 viewers.

References

External links

Comedy Central original programming
2010s American political comedy television series
2010s American satirical television series
2017 American television series debuts
2017 American television series endings
2010s American late-night television series
Comedy Central late-night programming
English-language television shows
Television shows set in Washington, D.C.
Television shows set in Florida
Parodies of Donald Trump
Political satirical television series
Television series about presidents of the United States